The Coriolis satellite is a Naval Research Laboratory (NRL) and Air Force Research Laboratory (AFRL) Earth and space observation satellite launched from Vandenberg Air Force Base, on 2003-01-06 at 14:19 GMT.

Instruments

WINDSAT 
WINDSAT is a joint Integrated Program Office/Department of Defense demonstration project, intended to measure ocean surface wind speed and wind direction from space using a polarimetric radiometer. WINDSAT was developed and managed by the Space Test Program at Kirtland AFB in New Mexico, designed for a three-year lifetime. It is primarily designed to measure ocean surface wind direction (nonprecipitating conditions) with a 25-km spatial resolution. Secondary measurements are Sea surface temperature,  soil moisture, rain rate, ice and snow characteristics and water vapor.

Solar Mass Ejection Imager (SMEI) 
The Solar Mass Ejection Imager (SMEI) is an instrument intended to detect disturbances in the solar wind by means of imaging scattered light from the free electrons in the plasma of the solar wind. To do this three CCD cameras observe sections of the sky of size 60 by 3 degree.

As the SMEI instrument observes the whole sky, data generated has been used to observe periodic changes in the brightness of stars. This data can be used to detect asteroseismological oscillation in giant stars, and for the detection of large eclipsing extra-solar planets.

External links 

 WINDSAT site at NOAA

Bibliography
 WINDSAT Project Information
 WINDSAT Contractors Web Site
 WINDSAT site at NRL 
 WINDSAT site at ONR
 Launch Schedule for ITC

Earth observation satellites of the United States
Spacecraft launched in 2003
United States Navy
Satellites of the United States Air Force